Tonnes is a village in Lurøy Municipality in Nordland county, Norway. It lies on a peninsula in the far northern edge of the municipality, to the north of the islands of Aldra and Lurøya, east of Storselsøya, and south of Rangsundøya.

References

External links
 
 Official site

Lurøy
Villages in Nordland